Edmund Josef von Horváth (9 December 1901, Sušak, Rijeka, Austria-Hungary – 1 June 1938, Paris France) was an Austro-Hungarian playwright and novelist who wrote in German, and went by the name of nom de guerre Ödön von Horváth. He was one of the most critically admired writers of his generation prior to his untimely death. He enjoyed a series of successes on the stage with socially poignant and romantic plays, including Revolte auf Côte 3018 (1927), Sladek (1929), Italienische Nacht (1930), Hin und Her (1934) and Der Jüngste Tag (1937). His novels include Der ewige Spießer (1930), Ein Kind unserer Zeit (1938) and Jugend ohne Gott (1938).

Early life and education
Ödön von Horváth was the eldest son of an Austro-Hungarian diplomat of Hungarian origin from Slavonia, Edmund (Ödön) Josef Horváth, and Maria Lulu Hermine (Prehnal) Horváth, who was from an Austro-Hungarian military family.

From 1908, Ödön attended elementary school in Budapest, and later attended the Rákóczianum, where his education was in the Hungarian language. In 1909, his father was ennobled and assigned to Munich, unaccompanied. In 1913, Horváth attended secondary school in Pressburg and Vienna, where he learned German as a second language, and earned the Matura (secondary school diploma) then reunited with his parents at Murnau am Staffelsee; from 1919, Horváth studied at the Ludwig Maximilians University, in Munich.

Later life and death
He started writing as a student, from 1920. Quitting university without a degree in early 1922, he moved to Berlin. Later, he lived in Salzburg and Murnau am Staffelsee in Upper Bavaria. In 1931, he was awarded, along with Erik Reger, the Kleist Prize. In 1933, at the beginning of the Nazi regime in Germany, he relocated to Vienna.

Following Austria's Anschluss with Germany in 1938, Horváth emigrated to Paris.

Ödön von Horváth was hit by a falling branch from a tree and killed during a thunderstorm on the Champs-Élysées in Paris, opposite the Théâtre Marigny, in June 1938. Ironically, only a few days earlier, von Horváth had said to a friend: "I am not so afraid of the Nazis...There are worse things one can be afraid of, namely things one is afraid of without knowing why. For instance, I am afraid of streets. Roads can be hostile to one, can destroy one. Streets scare me." And a few years earlier, von Horváth had written poetry about lightning: "Yes, thunder, that it can do. And bolt and storm. Terror and destruction."

Ödön von Horváth was buried in Saint-Ouen cemetery in northern Paris.  In 1988, on the 50th anniversary of his death, his remains were transferred to Vienna and reinterred at the Heiligenstädter Friedhof.

Literary themes

Important topics in Horváth's works were popular culture, politics and history. He especially tried to warn of the dawn of fascism and its dangers.  Among Horváth's more enduringly popular works,  (Youth Without God) describes the youth in Nazi Germany from a disgruntled teacher's point of view, who initially is an opportunist, but is helpless against the racist and militaristic Nazi propaganda that de-humanizes his pupils.

The title of his novel Ein Kind unserer Zeit (A Child of Our Time) was used in English by Michael Tippett for his oratorio (1939–1941), composed during World War II.

Works

Plays 
 Das Buch der Tänze, 1920
 Mord in der Mohrengasse, 1923
 Zur schönen Aussicht, 1926
 Revolte auf Côte 3018 (Revolt on Hill 3018), 1927; rewritten as Die Bergbahn (The Mountain Railway), 1929
 Sladek der schwarze Reichswehrmann, 1929, originally Sladek oder Die schwarze Armee (Sladek in volume Plays One, translation by Penny Black, Oberon, 2000)
 Rund um den Kongreß, 1929 (A Sexual Congress in volume Plays One, translation by Penny Black, Oberon, 2000)
 Italienische Nacht, 1930 (Italian Night in volume Plays Two, Oberon, 2000)
 Geschichten aus dem Wiener Wald (Tales from the Vienna Woods), 1931, winner of the Kleist Prize the same year; available as well in volume Plays Two, Oberon, 2000)
 Glaube, Liebe, Hoffnung, 1932 (Faith, Hope, and Charity in volume Four Plays, PAJ Publications, 1986)
 Kasimir und Karoline, 1932 (Kasimir and Karoline in volume Four Plays, PAJ Publications, 1986)
 Die Unbekannte aus der Seine, 1933
 Hin und Her, 1934
 Don Juan kommt aus dem Krieg, 1936 (Don Juan Comes Back From the War, Faber & Faber, 1978)
 Figaro läßt sich scheiden, 1936. Giselher Klebe wrote the libretto and composed his 1963 opera of the same name based on this work; Elena Langer's 2016 opera Figaro Gets a Divorce, to a libretto by David Pountney, is also largely based on the play. (Figaro Gets a Divorce in volume Four Plays, PAJ Publications, 1986)
 Pompeji. Komödie eines Erdbebens, 1937
 Ein Dorf ohne Männer, 1937
 Himmelwärts, 1937
 Der Jüngste Tag, 1937 (Giselher Klebe composed his 1980 opera of the same name based on this work; Lore Klebe wrote the libretto) (Judgement Day in volume Four Plays, PAJ Publications, 1986)

Novels 
  Sechsunddreißig Stunden, 1929
 Der ewige Spießer, 1930 (The Eternal Philistine, 2011)
 Jugend ohne Gott, 1938 (The Age of the Fish, 1939)
 Ein Kind unserer Zeit, 1938 (A Child of Our Time, 1939)

Other prose 
 Sportmärchen, 1924–1926
 Interview, 1932
 Gebrauchsanweisung, 1932

Quotes 

"Nothing conveys the feeling of infinity as much as stupidity does." (Motto of Geschichten aus dem Wienerwald)
"Eigentlich bin ich ganz anders, nur komme ich so selten dazu." "Actually what I'm really like is very different. I just so rarely find time for it." (From Zur schönen Aussicht)
Ödön von Horváth was once walking in the Bavarian Alps when he discovered the skeleton of a long dead man with his knapsack still intact. Von Horváth opened the knapsack and found a postcard reading "Having a wonderful time". Asked by friends what he did with it, von Horváth replied "I posted it".
"If you ask me what is my native country, I answer: I was born in Fiume, grew up in Belgrade, Budapest, Pressburg [Bratislava], Vienna and Munich, and I have a Hungarian passport, but I have no fatherland. I am a very typical mix of old Austria-Hungary: at once Magyar, Croatian, German and Czech; my country is Hungary; my mother tongue is German."

In popular culture
Christopher Hampton's play Tales from Hollywood (1982, adapted for television in 1992) portrays a fictional Horváth. He survives the falling branch and moves to the United States, where expatriate German authors such as Bertolt Brecht and Heinrich Mann write for the motion picture industry.
Danilo Kiš's short story "The Man Without a Country", published in the 1994 collection The Lute and The Scars, fictionalizes the death of von Horváth.
Duncan Macmillan adapted von Horváth’s Don Juan Comes Back From The War for the National Theatre Studio and Finborough Theatre in 2012. The updated production used contemporary language to explore the effects of conflict and trauma. It was directed by Andrea Ferran.
Lydia Davis' short story "Ödön von Horváth Out Walking," published in the 2014 collection Can't and Won't, concerns Horváth's encounter with the skeleton in the Alps.

References

Bibliography

Balme, Christopher B., The Reformation of Comedy Genre Critique in the Comedies of Odon von Horvath University of Otago, Dunedin 1985  

1901 births
1938 deaths
Writers from Rijeka
20th-century Austrian novelists
20th-century Austrian dramatists and playwrights
Austrian male dramatists and playwrights
Austrian emigrants to France
Austrian male novelists
Austrian people of Hungarian descent
Austro-Hungarian writers
German-language writers
Hungarian nobility
Kleist Prize winners
Accidental deaths in France
20th-century Austrian male writers